Ravi Prakash (born 26 August  1960) is an Indian politician for the Kheri (Lok Sabha constituency) in Uttar Pradesh who since 2014 is a member of the Upper House (Rajya Sabha) of the Indian Parliament.

References 

1960 births
Living people
People from Uttar Pradesh
Samajwadi Party politicians from Uttar Pradesh